The Asian section of the 2018 FIVB Volleyball Women's World Championship qualification acts as qualifiers for the 2018 FIVB Volleyball Women's World Championship, to be held in Japan, for national teams which are members of the Asian Volleyball Confederation (AVC). A total of 4+1 slots (4 direct slots and 1 host slot) in the final tournament are available for AVC teams.

Pools composition
15 AVC national teams entered qualification.

First round
There are three confederation zonal competitions. The winner of each competition competed in second round. Because Macau, New Zealand and Tonga later withdrew, North Korea and Fiji automatically qualified for the second round.

Second round
The top seven ranked teams from FIVB World Ranking as of 1 January 2015 qualified automatically for this round. The top six ranked teams seeded by the serpentine system. The other four teams were drawn.

First round
The winners in each zone will qualify for the second round.

Central Asia
Venue:  Indoor Hall of Youth Centre, Malé, Maldives
Dates: 27–29 January 2017
 All times are Maldives Time (UTC+05:00)
 India was initially chosen as the host country for the event. However, due to internal problems with the Volleyball Federation of India, the Asian Volleyball Confederation decided to shift the competition venue from India to Male in the Maldives.  The AVC informed all the participating teams in the tournament that if they wanted to compete in the event, they had to reconfirm their participation to the AVC and the Volleyball Association of Maldives by December 31.  Maldives, Nepal, and Iran confirmed their participation and played in Malé January 27-29, 2017.   

|}

|}

Second round
The winners and runners-up in each pool will qualify for the 2018 World Championship.

Pool A
 Venue:  Baluan Sholak Sports Palace, Almaty, Kazakhstan
 Dates: 20–24 September 2017
 All times are Kazakhstan Standard Time (UTC+06:00).

|}

|}

Pool B
 Venue:  Nakhon Pathom Sports Center Gymnasium, Nakhon Pathom, Thailand
 Dates: 20–24 September 2017
 All times are Thailand Standard Time (UTC+07:00).

|}

|}

References

External links

2018 FIVB Volleyball Women's World Championship
2017 in women's volleyball